Darwinia pauciflora is a species of flowering plant in the family Myrtaceae and is endemic to the southwest of Western Australia. It is an open to bushy shrub with oblong to egg-shaped leaves and heads of erect, creamy-white and pink flowers.

Description
The flowers are arranged in upper leaf axils or on the ends of branches, in heads of 3 to 6, surrounded by short, broad bracteoles but that fall off as the flowers open. The petals are creamy-white and pink, almost as long as the sepal tube and the style is slightly longer than the petals. Flowering mainly occurs from May to October.

Taxonomy
Darwinia pauciflora  was first formally described in 1865 by George Bentham in the Journal of the Linnean Society, Botany from a specimen collected by Augustus Oldfield near the Hutt River. The specific epithet (pauciflora) means "few-flowered".

Distribution and habitat
This darwinia is found on hillsides or sandplains in the Avon Wheatbelt, Geraldton Sandplains and Swan Coastal Plain bioregions in the south-west of Western Australia where it grows in sandy soils.

References

 

pauciflora
Endemic flora of Western Australia
Myrtales of Australia
Rosids of Western Australia
Plants described in 1865
Taxa named by George Bentham